Charaxes junius is a butterfly in the family Nymphalidae. It is found in Ethiopia and Sudan. The habitat consists of forests and woodland savanna.

Description
Charaxes junius is distinguished from brutus by having the discal band on the upper surface light yellow and in cellule 1 b of the forewing 6-1 mm. in breadth. Abyssinia. - — somalicus Rothsch. only differs from junius in the somewhat narrower median band on both wings. Somaliland.

Subspecies
Charaxes junius junius (western and south-western Ethiopia)
Charaxes junius somalicus Rothschild, 1900 (southern Ethiopia, south-eastern Sudan)

Taxonomy
Charaxes junius Oberthür, 1880 is treated as a subspecies of brutus (Cramer, 1779) by Van Someren  Henning treats junius as a distinct species on the authority of Plantrou (1983).

Related species
Historical attempts to assemble a cluster of presumably related species into a "Charaxes jasius Group" have not been wholly convincing. More recent taxonomic revision, corroborated by phylogenetic research, allow a more rational grouping congruent with cladistic relationships. Within a well-populated clade of 27 related species sharing a common ancestor approximately 16 mya during the Miocene, 26 are now considered together as The jasius Group.  One of the two lineages within this clade forms a robust monophyletic group of seven species sharing a common ancestor approximately 2-3 mya, i.e. during the Pliocene, and are considered as the jasius subgroup. The second lineage leads to 19 other species within the Jasius group, which are split in to three well-populated subgroups of closely related species.

The jasius Group (26 Species).

Clade 1: the jasius subgroup.

Clade 2: contains the three well-populated additional subgroups (19 species) of the jasius Group, called the brutus, pollux, and eudoxus subgroups.

the brutus subgroup (4 Species)
Charaxes brutus
Charaxes antiquus
Charaxes junius
Charaxes andara

Further exploration of the phylogenetic relationships amongst existing Charaxes taxa is required to improve clarity.

References

van Someren, V.G.L. 1970 Revisional notes on African Charaxes (Lepidoptera: Nymphalidae). Part VI. Bulletin of the British Museum (Natural History) (Entomology)197-250. page 218 and plate 4,figure 33

External links
Charaxes junius somalicus images at Consortium for the Barcode of Life

Butterflies described in 1880
junius
Fauna of Somalia
Butterflies of Africa
Taxa named by Charles Oberthür